Bill Plympton (born April 30, 1946) is an American animator, graphic designer, cartoonist, and filmmaker best known for his 1987 Academy Awards-nominated animated short Your Face and his series of shorts featuring a dog character starting with 2004's Guard Dog.

Early life
Plympton was born in Portland, Oregon, the son of Wilda Jean (Jerman) and Donald F. Plympton, and was raised on a farm in nearby Oregon City with five siblings: Sally, Tia, Peggy, David and Peter. From 1964 to 1968, he studied Graphic Design at Portland State University, where he was a member of the film society and worked on the yearbook. In 1968, he transferred to the School of Visual Arts in New York City, where he majored in cartooning. He graduated from SVA in 1969.

Career
Plympton's illustrations and cartoons have been published in The New York Times and the weekly newspaper The Village Voice, as well as in the magazines Vogue, Rolling Stone, Vanity Fair, Penthouse, and National Lampoon. His political cartoon strip Plympton, which began in 1975 in the SoHo Weekly News, eventually was syndicated and appeared in over 20 newspapers.

In 1988, his animated short Your Face was nominated for the Academy Award for Best Animated Short Film. He also became known for other animated short films, including 25 Ways to Quit Smoking (1989) and Enemies (1991), the latter of which was part of the Animania series on MTV, where many of his other shorts were shown. 

In 1991, Plympton won the Prix Spécial du Jury at the Cannes Film Festival for Push Comes to Shove which was featured on MTV's animated series Liquid Television. In 1992, his self-financed, first feature-length animated film, The Tune debuted at the Sundance Film Festival.
His work also appeared on the 1992–1993 Fox comedy series The Edge. In 1993, he made his first live action film, J. Lyle.

In 1995, he contributed animation and graphics to a computer game collection, Take Your Best Shot. He also published a comic book in 2003, The Sleazy Cartoons of Bill Plympton. 

The actress Martha Plimpton, a distant relative of his, served as associate producer on Plympton's animated feature Hair High (2004), doing much of the casting. The movie's voice cast included her father Keith Carradine and her uncle David Carradine.

Later works
Guard Dog (2004) was also nominated for the Academy Award for Best Animated Short Film. In 2005, Plympton animated a music video for Kanye West's "Heard 'Em Say" and the following year, he created the music video for "Weird Al" Yankovic's "Don't Download This Song". Plympton contributed animation to the 2006 History Channel series 10 Days That Unexpectedly Changed America, to illustrate the events of Shays' Rebellion. Together with other independent New York City animators, he has released two DVDs of animated shorts, both titled Avoid Eye Contact.

Plympton's 2008 80-minute feature, Idiots and Angels presented by Terry Gilliam, had no dialogue. The film premiered at the Tribeca Film Festival on 26 April 2008,

In 2011, Alexia Anastasio completed a documentary on Plympton's life, Adventures in Plymptoons!, released in September 2012 direct-to-DVD and on video-on-demand.

In 2011, Plympton collaborated with child film critic Perry Chen on Ingrid Pitt: Beyond the Forest, a 2011 short animated film directed by Kevin Sean Michaels, about actress and Holocaust survivor Ingrid Pitt.

Plympton animated the opening couch gag for the Simpsons episodes "Beware My Cheating Bart" in 2012, "Black Eyed, Please" in 2013, "Married to the Blob" in 2014, "Lisa the Veterinarian" in 2016, "22 for 30" in 2017, "3 Scenes Plus a Tag from a Marriage" in 2018, "Manger Things" in 2021 and "One Angry Lisa" in 2022; as well as the menus and packaging for the Season 19 DVD.

Plympton directed the segment "On Eating and Drinking" in the 2014 animated film The Prophet, adapted from Kahlil Gibran's book The Prophet. In 2018, Plympton created a series of videos for The New York Times called “Trump Bites”. One of the series, Trump and Putin: A Love Story, depicts Trump and Putin kissing half-naked. Critics said the video implied that gay relationships were inherently comical and immoral.

In 2020, Plympton released a Kickstarter for his new animated comedy western, Slide. The funding was successful and Plympton plans on finishing the film by 2022.

Legacy
A collection of more than 180 Plympton items is held at the Academy Film Archive. The archive has preserved Plympton's films such as Your Face, The Tune, Guard Dog, and The Cow Who Wanted to Be a Hamburger.

His films have featured in the Animation Show of Shows including  Your Face, Guard Dog, Eat (2001), The Fan and the Flower (2005), and Santa: The Fascist Years (2009).

Personal life
On December 23, 2011, Plympton married animator/artist/illustrator Sandrine Flament at his sister's house in Oregon. Their son, Lucas, was born in September 2012.

Influences
Plympton has stated he has many influences, the biggest being the work of the Walt Disney studio with others including Tex Avery, Bob Clampett, Robert Crumb, Milton Glaser, Charles Addams, Roland Topor, Quentin Tarantino, Frank Capra, Richard Lester, Bob Godfrey, Saul Steinberg, Tomi Ungerer, Jacques Tati, Milt Kahl, Carlos Nine, and Jules Feiffer. He said I Married a Strange Person! "was influenced by Peter Jackson, some of his earlier films ... where he used gore and violence and blood as humor."

Awards
 1988 Academy Award nomination for Short Animation: "Your Face"
 1991 Jury Prize for Short Films, "Push Comes to Shove", Cannes Film Festival
 2004 Inkpot Award winner
 2005 Academy Award nomination for Short Animation: "Guard Dog"
 2006 Winsor McCay Award Annie Awards by ASIFA-Hollywood
 2011 20th Annual Cinema St. Louis Film Festival (traditional name: St. Louis International Film Festival), Lifetime Achievement Award
 2011 Burbank International Film Festival, Pioneer in Theatrical Animation Award
 2011 Action On Film International Film Festival, Lifetime Achievement Award
 2013 ANIMAFicx Award, 51st Gijon International Film Festival: "Cheatin'"

Filmography

Animated features
 The Tune (1992)
 I Married a Strange Person! (1997)
 Mutant Aliens (2001)
 Hair High (2004)
 Idiots and Angels (2008)
 Cheatin' (2013)
 Revengeance (2016)
 Slide (TBA)

Documentaries
 Fuck (2005; provided animated sequences)
 Adventures in Plymptoons! by Alexia Anastasio (2011)

Live-action features
 J. Lyle (1993)
 Guns on the Clackamas(1995)
 Walt Curtis, the Peckerneck Poet (1997)
 Hitler's Folly (a mockumentary) (2016)

Animated shorts
Source unless otherwise noted:

 Lucas the Ear of Corn (1977; 4:00)
 Boomtown (1985; 6:00)
 Love in the Fast Lane (1985; 3:00)
 Your Face (1987; 3:10)
 Drawing Lesson #2 (1988; 6:00)
 One of Those Days (1988: 7:50)
 How to Kiss (1989; 6:35)
 25 Ways to Quit Smoking (1989; 5:00)
 Plymptoons (1990; 6:45)
 Tango Schmango (1991)
 Dig My Do (1990; 4:00)
 The Wiseman (1990: 4:30)
 Push Comes to Shove (1991; 6:30)
 Draw (1993; 2:00)
 Faded Roads (1994; 2:30)
 Nosehair (1994; 7:00)
 How to Make Love to a Woman (1995; 5:00)
 Smell the Flowers (1996; 2:00)
 Boney D (1996; 3:00)
 Plympmania (1996; 8:00)
 Sex & Violence (1997; 8:00)
 The Exciting Life of a Tree (1998; 7:00)
 More Sex & Violence (1998; 7;00)
 Surprise Cinema (1999; 7:00)
 Life (1999, 6:10) (presenter, animator)
 Can't Drag Race with Jesus (2000; 2:00)
 Eat (2001; 9:00)
 Parking (2002; 5:22)
 Guard Dog (2004; 5:00)
 The Fan and The Flower (2005; 7:10)
 Guide Dog (2006; 5:45) (sequel to Guard Dog)
 Shuteye Hotel (2007; 7:00)
 Gary Guitar (2008) (episode of Random! Cartoons)
 Hot Dog (2008) (third in the Guard Dog series)
 Santa: The Fascist Years (2009)
 Horn Dog (2009) (fourth in the Guard Dog series)
 The Cow Who Wanted to Be a Hamburger (2010)
 Summer Bummer (2011; 1:49)
 Waiting For Her Sailor (2011; 0:30)
 Tiffany the Whale: Death on the Runway (2012; 8:56)
 Drunker Than a Skunk (2013; 3:30)
 ABCs of Death 2 (segment-H is for Head Games)
 Footprints (2014; 4:01)
 The Loneliest Stoplight (2015; 6:18)
Cop Dog (2017)

Animated TV shorts
 12 Tiny Christmas Tales (2001)
 ChalkZone “That Thing You Drew”
 Random! Cartoons - Gary Guitar
 The Simpsons couch gags (s23e18, s24e15, s25e10, s27e15, s28e17, s29e13, s32e16 and s34e02)

Compilations (DVD)
 Avoid Eye Contact Vol. 1
 Avoid Eye Contact Vol. 2
 Plymptoons: The Complete Early Works of Bill Plympton (1992)
 Bill Plympton's Dirty Shorts (2006)
 Mondo Plympton (2007)
 Bill Plympton's Dog Days (2009)
 Bill Plympton's Dogs & Cows (2013)

Music videos
 Peter Himmelman – "245 Days" (1990)
 Kanye West – "Heard 'Em Say" (2005)
 "Weird Al" Yankovic – "Don't Download This Song" (2006)
 Parson Brown, "Mexican Standoff" (2008)
 "Weird Al" Yankovic – "TMZ" (2011)
 Cousin Joe Twoshacks (Joe Cartoon) - "Deep End" (2014)
NO SNOW FOR CHRISTMAS

Commercials

 MTV public service announcement "Acid Rain" (1989)
 Trivial Pursuit (3) (1990–91)
 Nutrasweet (1991)
 Soloflex "Transformation" (1992)
 Oregon Lottery "Blackjack" (1992)
 Taco Bell "Fuddy Duddy" (1993)
 Nik Naks (UK) (1993)
 Microsoft Windows '95 (1995)
 AirTouch Cellular (1996)
 AT&T "Longshot" (1996)
 AT&T Wireless "Map-O-Rama" (1997)
 NBC "Peacock Bumper" (1997)
 7-11/PBS "Head" & "Explore" (1998)
 The Money Store "End of the World" & "Rollercoaster" (1998)
 Geico Direct (6) (1999)
 Wilson Tennis (3) (2002)
 United Airlines "Signature" (2005)

References

External links

 Plymptoons.com (official website). Retrieved on May 5, 2018.
Bill Plympton at IMDb. Retrieved on May 5, 2018.
Criterion Channel trailer
Plymptoons' official YouTube channel
Official Vimeo channel

1946 births
Animators from Oregon
American animated film directors
Portland State University alumni
School of Visual Arts alumni
Artists from Portland, Oregon
American voice directors
Living people
Inkpot Award winners
Culture of Portland, Oregon